Cavansite, whose name is derived from its chemical composition, calcium vanadium silicate, is a deep blue hydrous calcium vanadium phyllosilicate mineral, occurring as a secondary mineral in basaltic and andesitic rocks along with a variety of zeolite minerals.  It's blue coloring comes from vanadium, a metal ion.  Discovered in 1967 in Malheur County, Oregon, cavansite is a relatively rare mineral. It is polymorphic with the even rarer mineral, pentagonite. It is most frequently found in Pune, India and in the Deccan Traps, a large igneous province.

Uses of cavansite
Although cavansite contains vanadium, and could thus be a possible ore source for the element, it is not generally considered an ore mineral. However, because of its rich color and relative rarity, cavansite is a sought-after collector's mineral.

Associated minerals

 Members of the apophyllite group
 Members of the zeolite group, particularly stilbite
 babingtonite, Ca2Fe2Si5O14OH
 quartz, SiO2
 calcite, CaCO3
 pentagonite, Ca(VO)Si4O10 · 4(H2O)

Notes for identification

Cavansite is a distinctive mineral. It tends to form crystal aggregates, generally in the form of balls, up to a couple centimeters in size. Sometimes the balls are coarse enough to allow the individual crystals to be seen. Rarely, cavansite forms bowtie-shaped aggregates. The color of cavansite is distinctive, almost always a rich, bright blue. The color is the same as its dimorph, pentagonite, but the latter is generally much more spikey with bladed crystals. Finally, the associated minerals are useful for identification, as cavansite is frequently found sitting atop a matrix of zeolites or apophyllites.

References

Mineral galleries
 Evans, H.T. Jr., "The crystal structure of cavansite and pentagonite", American Mineralogist, Vol. 58, pg. 412-424, 1973.
 Makki, M.F., "Collecting cavansite in the Wagholi quarry complex, Pune, Maharashtra, India", The Mineralogical Record, Vol. 36, No. 6, pg. 507-512, Nov-Dec 2005.
 Staples, L.W., Evans, H.T. Jr., and Lindsay, J.R., "Cavansite and pentagonite, new dimorphous calcium vanadium silicate minerals from Oregon", American Mineralogist, Vol. 58, pg 405-411, 1973. http://www.minsocam.org/ammin/AM58/AM58_405.pdf

External links

Calcium minerals
Minerals in space group 62
Orthorhombic minerals
Phyllosilicates
Vanadium minerals
Vanadyl compounds